Siedlec  is a village in the administrative district of Gmina Izbicko, within Strzelce County, Opole Voivodeship, in south-western Poland.

The village has a population of 480.

References

Siedlec